Streetcars in Kansas City were the primary public transit mode during the late 19th and early 20th centuries, like most North American cities. Kansas City, Missouri once had one of the most extensive streetcar systems in North America, but the last of its 25 streetcar routes was shut down in 1957. All but five North American metropolises – Toronto, Boston, Philadelphia, San Francisco, and New Orleans – replaced all their streetcar networks with buses, including Kansas City. Three other cities, Newark, Pittsburgh, and Cleveland, operated rail lines more akin to modern light rail that remain operating.

History

Horsecar and cable car era
The first streetcars introduced in Kansas City in 1870 were horse-powered.

On some early routes predating 1908, the streetcars were propelled by gripping moving underground cables, like San Francisco's cable cars.

The city granted its first franchise to the Metropolitan Street Railway Company, owned by Thomas Corrigan. William Rockhill Nelson, publisher of the Kansas City Star, believed Corrigan was corrupt, and used the Star to lobby against renewing his franchise.

Electrified streetcars
By 1908, all but one of Kansas City's streetcar routes had been converted to electricity.

When the Kansas City Public Service Company (KSPS) was created in 1925, it inherited over 700 streetcars that had been owned and operated by private companies. The streetcar routes operated by the KSPS also served across the state line in Kansas City, Kansas.

The KSPS planned to replace all its older streetcars with new, state-of-the-art PCC streetcars, which would have required 371 vehicles. Only 24 were delivered prior to World War II, which put a hiatus on new streetcar construction. The KSPS ultimately acquired 184 PCC vehicles.

Famed Kansas City developer JC Nichols constructed streetcar lines to serve the new communities he built.

Modern streetcars
The modern KC Streetcar was installed in 2014 and opened to the public in 2016. It runs a similar, but shorter, route to the last line that ran in 1957.

KCPS 551

Kansas City Public Service streetcar 551 is a PCC (President's Conference Committee) streetcar preserved for static display in the River Market neighborhood of Kansas City. It was built in 1947 by the St. Louis Car Company for service in Kansas City. When the city closed its streetcar service, it was sold to the Toronto Transit Commission in 1957 and became TTC 4762. In 1973, the streetcar was sold to the San Francisco Municipal Railway, renumbered as Muni 1190 and ran as a tourist attraction. In 1979, the streetcar was sold to the Western Railway Museum remaining as Muni 1190. In 2006, KC Regional Transit Alliance purchased the streetcar, restored it as KCPS 551 and put it on static display at Kansas City Union Station. In 2016, the streetcar was put into storage as its Union Station site was to be repurposed. Finally, in 2017 the streetcar was moved again for display on its current River Market site next to the modern KC Streetcar line.

Tentative plans to restore 551 to operating condition and run it on the KC Streetcar line for special events were abandoned because 551 was a single-ended car, and the modern KC Streetcar line has no turning loops.

Streetcar 551 is located on a lot at 426 Delaware Street at the corner of West Fifth Street. Denver-based Epoch Developments owns the streetcar and ten buildings along Delaware Street. Epoch uses the streetcar interior for retail and a cafe.

References

External links

History of Kansas City, Missouri
Kansas City